A street is a public thoroughfare in a built environment.

Street may also refer to:

Places
 Street (crater), a crater on the Moon named after the astronomer Thomas Street
 Street, Devon, England, United Kingdom
 Street, Somerset, England, United Kingdom
 Street, County Westmeath (civil parish), barony of Moygoish, Ireland
 Street, County Westmeath, Ireland
 Street, Maryland, United States
 Street Mountain (New York), in the Street Range of the Adirondack Mountains, United States

Music
 Street (Herman Brood & His Wild Romance album), a 1997 album by Dutch rock band Herman Brood & His Wild Romance
 Street (EXID album), a 2016 album by South Korean girl group EXID
 Street (Nina Hagen album), 1991
"Street", a song by G Herbo from the 2017 album Humble Beast

People
 Street (surname)

See also
 The Street (disambiguation)
 Street people (disambiguation)
 Streeter (disambiguation)
 Streets (disambiguation)
 Mean Streets (disambiguation)
 
 Strait